The Charles LeFeber House is a historic house in the Downtown Neighborhood of Albuquerque, New Mexico. It was built in 1909 and was the home of Charles A. LeFeber (c. 1883–1957), a local contractor, until his death. LeFeber probably built the house himself. It was listed on the New Mexico State Register of Cultural Properties in 1979 and the National Register of Historic Places in 1980.

The house is notable for its unusual architecture. It is an eclectic cottage with "touches of Tudor Revival styling", and does not resemble any other designs that were popular at the time. In particular, it has a very unusual gable roof with sloped ends and an angled porch roof supported by two Doric columns. The house originally had clapboard siding but is now stuccoed.

References

Houses on the National Register of Historic Places in New Mexico
National Register of Historic Places in Albuquerque, New Mexico
Houses in Albuquerque, New Mexico
New Mexico State Register of Cultural Properties
Houses completed in 1909